Hastula solida, common name the solid auger, is a species of sea snail, a marine gastropod mollusc in the family Terebridae, the auger snails.

Description
The length of the shell varies between 23 mm and 35 mm.

Distribution
This marine species occurs in the tropical Indo-Pacific off Aldabra, the Mascarene Basin, New Guinea and Fiji.

References

 Taylor, J.D. (1973). Provisional list of the mollusca of Aldabra Atoll.
 Bratcher T. & Cernohorsky W.O. (1987). Living terebras of the world. A monograph of the recent Terebridae of the world. American Malacologists, Melbourne, Florida & Burlington, Massachusetts. 240pp.
 Terryn Y. (2007). Terebridae: A Collectors Guide. Conchbooks & NaturalArt. 59pp + plates.
 Severns M. (2011) Shells of the Hawaiian Islands - The Sea Shells. Conchbooks, Hackenheim. 564 pp. 
 Castelin M., Puillandre N., Kantor Yu. I., Modica M.V., Terryn Y., Cruaud C., Bouchet P. & Holford M. (2012) Macroevolution of venom apparatus innovations in auger snails (Gastropoda; Conoidea; Terebridae). Molecular Phylogenetics and Evolution 64: 21–44.

External links
 

Terebridae
Gastropods described in 1855